Karel Nováček defeated Jean-Philippe Fleurian 7–6(7–5), 7–6(7–4) to win the 1991 Benson and Hedges Open singles competition. Scott Davis was the champion but did not defend his title.

Seeds
A champion seed is indicated in bold text while text in italics indicates the round in which that seed was eliminated.

  Emilio Sánchez (quarterfinals)
  Andrei Chesnokov (second round)
  Richard Fromberg (first round)
  Karel Nováček (champion)
  Luiz Mattar (semifinals)
  Omar Camporese (second round)
  Alex Antonitsch (second round)
  Gilad Bloom (first round)

Draw

Key
 Q – Qualifier
 WC – Wild card
 WO – Walkover

External links
 ATP Men's Singles draw

Singles
ATP Auckland Open